"The Paddington Frisk" is a single by British rock band Enter Shikari. The music video was released on their YouTube channel on 4 April 2013 and the single was released the same day.

Music video
The music video was filmed in London by Kode Media under the direction of Jamie Korn and released on 5 April 2013. The video showcases the band on a Japanese game show where a girl gives a man in a crocodile suit a noose and the band performs a choreographed dance miming hanging themselves. At the end of the video, the camera pans out to show the band in a board meeting presenting the video to an executive, who has a shocked expression on his face, with the band smiling.

Track listing
Digital single

Shikari Sound System single

Band members
Roughton "Rou" Reynolds – lead vocals, synthesizer, keyboards, programming
Chris Batten – bass guitar, backing vocals
Liam "Rory" Clewlow – guitar, backing vocals
Rob Rolfe – drums, percussion, backing vocals

References

Enter Shikari songs
2013 singles
2013 songs
Hopeless Records singles